Gegenes hottentota, the marsh Hottentot skipper, Hottentot skipper or Latreille's skipper, is a butterfly of the family Hesperiidae. It is found in Africa and south-western Arabia. The habitat consists of marshy areas with thick grass, especially in valleys.

The wingspan is 31–34 mm for males, and 31–36 mm for females. Adults are on wing year-round in warmer areas (with a peak from April to May).

The larvae feed on Oldenlandia corymbosa.

References

Hesperiinae
Butterflies described in 1824